Urdnot Wrex is a fictional character in BioWare's Mass Effect franchise, who serves as a party member (or "squadmate") in the first game of the Mass Effect trilogy. He is a krogan, an alien race near-sterilised by other galactic races for their violence and high population growth. Introduced as an experienced krogan mercenary, his role changes in Mass Effect 2 and Mass Effect 3 where he becomes leader of an expanding krogan clan and eventual head of state for the krogan as a whole. After over 1000 years of aimless apathy, Wrex seeks to bring back hope to his people and reverse their fate by undoing the genophage. He is voiced by Steven Barr.

Wrex was given a "splash" of red color and scars to distinguish him from other individuals of his species. The scars further stress his combat experience. His stand-off with the player-character was presented as an example of Mass Effects cinematography. The character will appear in the second and third games if the player imports a savegame where Wrex survives a stand-off with the player character, Commander Shepard. In the Citadel downloadable content for the third game, he is available as a guest squadmate for the DLC's duration. In addition to the games, he is the star of the Mass Effect: Foundation comic series' second issue. Merchandise of the character has also been made available.

The character was positively received, with praise going to his humour and writing. His stand-off with Shepard in the first game drew attention and commentary from video game journalists.

Character overview
A famous bounty hunter and mercenary, Wrex is among the last of the Krogan Battle Masters. They are rare individuals who can combine biotic abilities with advanced weaponry and tactics. Wrex quickly gained fame for his battle powers and became a leader of one of the smaller Urdnot tribes at a very young age. To date, Wrex is the youngest krogan to be granted the honor in 1,000 years. Following the krogan genophage, Wrex turned his back on his people when his father, a krogan warlord who wanted to resume the war, betrayed and attempted to kill him after a feigned attempt at reconciliation. Wrex escaped, though not before taking his father's life in retaliation. During the past three centuries, Wrex has served no master except himself, working as a bodyguard, mercenary, soldier of fortune, and bounty hunter. One operation as a mercenary was with Saren Arterius as his employer, though Wrex immediately sensed something very troubling about the turian and left the contract without even waiting to get paid. His instincts were right: every other mercenary on the ship they were on turned up dead within a week. Despite his menacing appearance, Wrex rarely loses his temper. Likewise, Wrex does not voice his thoughts very often; but when he does, people are more than willing to listen, as the mere threat of his anger is enough to ensure that.

Creation and development
In order to distinguish Wrex from other krogan, his head was given a "splash" of red color as well as deep scarring. These scars across also demonstrated his combat experience. For Wrex's return in Mass Effect 2, he is envisioned to be the leader of his people. Since the krogan are consumed by constant internal warfare, they would live in the ruins scattered throughout their homeworld of Tuchanka, and players would find Wrex sitting on a throne surrounded by the rubble of the krogan's once-glorious civilization. 

Steven Barr voiced Wrex in all media. In the first game, senior writer Mac Walters focused on the character in addition to Garrus Vakarian. John Dombrow wrote Wrex in the third game.

Appearances

Mass Effect

Wrex makes his debut appearance in 2007's Mass Effect. A bounty hunter, Wrex is hired by the Shadow Broker to assassinate Fist, a former agent who had defected to the rogue Council Spectre, Saren. Wrex is first seen trying to intimidate his way through Chora's Den, where Fist is based, but is unsuccessful. Later, Commander Shepard meets with Wrex, looking for Fist as well. Wrex agrees to join Shepard, since they share a common goal. When Fist is found, after he tells them that he sent a quarian who had information on Saren to meet with agents of the Shadow Broker, who were going to kill her, Wrex fulfills his contract by killing Fist. After a brief reprimand from Shepard, they then invite Wrex to join their team, which he accepts, and spends his time in the cargo bay of the Normandy. In conversations with Shepard, Wrex talks about how he used to be a "Battle Master", which holds him in high regard in the krogan military, but the constant wars between the clans of the krogan homeworld, Tuchanka, brought forth by the genophage, caused him to leave, with the final straw being that Wrex's own father tried to kill him. Wrex also reveals that he was hired by Saren before, but during the mission with him, Wrex felt uneasy about Saren and left. Wrex's uneasiness with Saren proved accurate, as everyone else that Saren had hired for the mission ended up dead.

During the mission on Virmire, salarian Major Kirrahe tells Shepard that Saren has created a cloning facility, meant to try to cure the krogan genophage, a bioweapon created by the salarians to alter krogan fertility rates to keep krogan populations in check. When Kirrahe talks of destroying the facility, Wrex vehemently protests. Shepard then confronts Wrex, trying to reason with him that the facility needed to be destroyed. This causes Wrex to draw his gun on Shepard. At this point, based on the player's choices, Shepard can either convince Wrex that the krogan clones will just be slaves for Saren's army—which Wrex will agree with, and stand down—or Wrex will refuse to fall in line, and either Shepard or Ashley Williams will be forced to kill him.

Mass Effect 2

The character returns in 2010's Mass Effect 2, though he is not available as a squad member. If the player imports a Mass Effect save where Wrex was recruited and is still alive, he will appear on the krogan homeworld of Tuchanka and greet Shepard warmly on arrival. He will reveal he united many krogan clans under Clan Urdnot, and is instigating reforms as leader to prevent the krogan's eventual destruction. Should the player perform Grunt's loyalty mission, which involves letting Grunt join Clan Urdnot, Shepard will talk to Wrex and must then help Grunt on his "rite of passage". In Mordin's loyalty mission, he will point Shepard to a scout to continue it. Alternatively, if the player imports a save where Wrex died or was not recruited, his more bloodthirsty traditionalist half-brother Wreav will appear in his stead.

Mass Effect 3

If a save where Wrex is alive and was recruited is imported again, Wrex will appear in Mass Effect 3 as the leader of the krogan, and appears as part of a questline to cure the Genophage. In order to build forces for the fight against the Reapers, the turians request help from the krogan in repelling the Reapers from Palaven. Through his connections, Wrex learns that the salarians have fertile females held captive and that they are immune to the Genophage. He demands their immediate release if the krogan are to assist the turians. He journeys with Shephard to the salarian homeworld, Sur'Kesh, though only a single female, "Eve", has survived. Wrex remains on board the Normandy while the salarian scientist (Mordin or Padok Wiks) synthesize a cure from their tissues. 

Depending on whether Shepard chose to save or erase Maelon's genophage cure data from Mass Effect 2, Wrex may be open and friendly with Shepard, or cold and curt. If Shephard reveals the salarian sabotage, Wrex expresses gratitude and reaffirms his trust in Shephard. Before the battle, he proclaims Shepard as a champion to the krogan people, friend to Clan Urdnot, a brother/sister to him and that all krogan born after that day will know the name Shepard as meaning "hero". During the final stand on Earth, Wrex will be there addressing krogan troops. He remarks that Eve, whose real name is Urdnot Bakara, wants to name their first child after Mordin.

In the Citadel downloadable content, he becomes a party member for the DLC's duration, provided he is alive and Shepard chose to cure the genophage. Later, when Shepard meets him at the bar, Wrex expresses exhaustion over being endlessly hounded by hordes of krogan females. As they are now fertile and want their first offspring to be strong, Wrex is a popular candidate, all of which is only encouraged by Bakara.

If Shepard succeeds in sabotaging the cure, Wrex will eventually discover the deception, withdraws all krogan support from the war effort entirely and confronts Shepard at the Citadel, which forces Shepard or C-Sec forces to kill Wrex.

If a save is imported where Wrex was killed at the stand off in Virmine in Mass Effect, his role will be replaced by his broodbrother, Urdnot Wreav. Unlike Wrex, Wreav will not be smart enough to see through the deception, if Mordin was convinced to fake the genophage cure.

Mass Effect: Foundation
Wrex appears in the second Foundation issue, which tells the story of Wrex's initial attempt to eliminate Fist on behalf of the Shadow Broker in the original Mass Effect.

Reception
Prior to the release of the first game, Ray Muzyka, CEO of BioWare, believed that Wrex would prove one of the more popular squadmates. In addition, lead designer Preston Watamaniuk has called him his personal favourite character in the trilogy.

Upon release, Wrex received a positive reception. In a list of 50 characters, Gameplayer called him the sixth best Xbox character, praising "his no-nonsense approach, cool head, and poignant speeches". Tom Francis, writing for PC Gamer, wanted to see Wrex most out of all returning characters in Mass Effect 3, noting his popularity in how him simply saying "Shepard" had become a meme. In an article for Game Informer, Jeff Marchiafava named him the fictional character he'd bring round for Thanksgiving if he could. In a look at different RPG archetypes, GamesRadar's Lucas Sullivan called the character an example of the "Grizzled Veteran". Shamus Young from The Escapist Magazine called Wrex an example of the "Berzerker", which is one of several tropes Young believes BioWare writers like to rely on when writing their characters.

Wrex is well-regarded as a party member. Official Xbox Magazine awarded him "Sidekick of the Year", saying "Brilliant dialogue, pitch-perfect voice acting, and incredible comic timing made Wrex the most charming, fun, and just plain cool giant armored lizard we’ve ever (virtually) met." VideoGamer.com's list of "Top 10 Video Game Companions" placed him seventh and called him their favourite Mass Effect character, noting the humour in his bloodlust. Adam Biessener of Game Informer listed him second in his "The Top 5 Wingmen Of The Decade" article, commenting how his quality of writing separated him from other stereotypical "brusiers". GameZone's Dakota Grabowski placed him sixth in his list of top BioWare companions, noting the "entertainment value" in his conversations. Similarly Steven Hopper, for IGN, listed him as the third best squadmate in the Mass Effect games, calling him "stubborn" and "tough as nails". In IGN's reader-vote for "the ultimate RPG party", Wrex was the twelfth most requested. In a 2016 article, PC Gamer ranked Wrex the third best companion of the Mass Effect series. Green Man Gaming included Wrex in their top 5 list of the best characters from the Mass Effect franchise.

His stand-off and potential death scene in the first game drew attention. Pondering on the standoff with Wrex, Anthony Burch said he was motivated to reload a prior save after Wrex unexpectedly died during the standoff, as he did not have knowledge of the deciding factors that would lead to Wrex's survival of the standoff at the time. He compared his experience of both scenarios as follows: "I was kind of happy but bored by the ho-hum nature of Wrex's survival, while on the other I was shocked and emotionally moved, yet saddened, by his death." He concluded that for Mass Effect, "every consequence is more or less designed to satisfy the player,  the plot and gameplay mechanics always serving as wish fulfillment", and that the deciding factor Wrex's fate has always been well within the player's control: "the more you've shown the game how much you care about Wrex, the less likely he is to be killed".

Ryan Hodge, writing for GamesRadar, called it one of "gaming's most heartbreaking betrayals", commenting "The most heartbreaking part of Wrex's betrayal is he didn't want to do it. He wasn't evil all along or even being coerced." In an article titled "The Toughest Life Or Death Choice In The Gaming Universe", Kotaku's Stephen Totilo called the choice "shocking", noting how there was no obvious right answer to the dilemma. Toby McCasker, writing for IGN, felt a "pang of uncertainty" when he had his character kill Wrex, not due to the "brutality" of it, but rather pointing out how it felt incongruous to the story, as if he made the "wrong" choice. He then noted a sense of "narrative displacement" again when meeting Urdnot Wreav in the second game. PC Gamer staff member Chris Livingstone claimed that the only time he undid one of Mass Effect’s events in his playthroughs was, "in the first game, when an argument led to—shockingly, and I thought, unfairly—Wrex being shot dead in a cutscene. I couldn’t live with that. No way. Wrex was way too cool to die."

See also

References

Further reading

External links

Extraterrestrial characters in video games
Fictional bodyguards in video games
Fictional bounty hunters
Fictional characters with disfigurements
Fictional humanoids
Fictional mercenaries in video games
Fictional military personnel in video games
Fictional patricides
Fictional reptilians
Fictional special forces personnel
Fictional telekinetics
Fictional tribal chiefs
Fictional warlords in video games
Fictional war veterans
Fictional soldiers in video games
Male characters in video games
Mass Effect characters
Video game characters introduced in 2007
Video game sidekicks